Tuff Gong is the brand name associated with a number of businesses started by Bob Marley and the Marley family. 'Tuff Gong' comes from Marley's nickname, which was in turn an echo of that given to founder of the Rastafari movement, Leonard "The Gong" Howell.

Record label 
Tuff Gong is a record label formed by the reggae group The Wailers in 1970. Before 1981, the label used the facilities of Federal Records recording company in Marcus Garvey Drive. The first single on the label was "Run For Cover" by The Wailers. After 1973, the Tuff Gong headquarters was located at 56 Hope Road, Kingston, Jamaica — Bob Marley's home. The location is now home to the Bob Marley Museum.

The Tuff Gong label is distributed by Universal Music through Island Records.

Tuff Gong is the official Caribbean distributor of Warner Music Group, Universal Music Group, and Disney Music Group.

In Rockstar Games and Rockstar North's Grand Theft Auto IV, Tuff Gong Radio is based on the record label and is featured as one of the many fictional radio stations featured in-game. The station is dedicated to playing songs associated with Bob Marley, including tracks by his sons Stephen Marley and Damian "Jr. Gong" Marley.

Recording studio 

Tuff Gong is a full-service recording studio located in Kingston, Jamaica. In 1981, Bob Marley's wife, Rita Marley, purchased Ken Khouri's Federal Records recording studio, the island's very first pressing plant, and the company subsequently moved from 56 Hope Road to 220 Marcus Garvey Drive, where it continues to operate.

Tuff Gong includes a recording studio, mastering room, stamper room, pressing plant, cassette plant, wholesale record shop, booking agency, as well as offices for Rita Marley Music and Ghetto Youths International.

Tuff Gong International studio is one of the largest Caribbean studios and features the second-largest live recording space on the island with artists, musicians, producers and tourists traveling from around the world to visit the facility. 

A longtime resource for Jamaican musicians, Tuff Gong has been the location of recordings from Rita Marley, Capleton, Sly and Robbie, Shaggy, Bounty Killa, Lady Saw, Vybz Kartel, Popcaan, Ziggy Marley and the Melody Makers, I-Wayne, Beenie Man, Jimmy Cliff, and many others.

International music stars, such as Snoop Dogg, Sinead O'Connor, Kenny Chesney, Lauryn Hill, Self Defense Family, and Tiken Jah Fakoly have chosen the studio for both its recording resources and its history.

A renewed international interest in Jamaican music has led to studio being used by a younger generation of artists, including Major Lazer.

See also 
 List of record labels

References

External links 
 Tuff Gong Homepage
 Tuff Gong Worldwide

Jamaican record labels
Record labels established in 1970
Reggae record labels
Vanity record labels
Bob Marley
Island Records
Jamaican brands
Kingston, Jamaica